Paramesia pygmaeana is a species of moth of the family Tortricidae. It is found in Morocco.

References

	

Moths described in 1956
Archipini